Hicham Benayad-Cherif (born 24 February 1990) is a Canadian-Algerian basketball player who plays for GS Pétroliers and the Algeria national team.

Career
Benayad-Cherif played two seasons for Fort Wayne, and red-shirted his first season there.

Benayad-Cherif started his professional career with the KW Titans of the NBL Canada in 2016.

In 2019, he was a member of the GS Pétroliers team that qualified for the 2021 BAL season.

Personal
Benayad-Cherif founded the Elite Student Academy in Algeria in 2018, an organisation which consists of 800 student athletes. He won the inaugural BAL Ubuntu Award in the 2021 season, "for his ongoing efforts to use the game of basketball to positively impact the lives of Algerian youth."

BAL career statistics

|-
|style="text-align:left;"|2021
|style="text-align:left;"|GS Pétroliers
| 3 || 1 || 25.4 || .231 || .154 || .250 || 2.0 || .3 || .0 || .3 || 5.0
|- class="sortbottom"
| style="text-align:center;" colspan="2"|Career
| 3 || 1 || 25.4 || .231 || .154 || .250 || 2.0 || .3 || .0 || .3 || 5.0

References

External links
RealGM profile
Proballers profile

1990 births
Living people
Algerian men's basketball players
Basketball people from Quebec
Canadian men's basketball players
GS Pétroliers basketball players
KW Titans players
Small forwards
Sportspeople from Laval, Quebec